María Constanza Camargo Bohórquez is a Colombian cancer epidemiologist who researches the Epstein–Barr virus and gastric carcinogenesis. She is an investigator in the metabolic epidemiology branch at the National Cancer Institute.

Life 
Camargo was born to Aracely and Efrain. She completed a M.H.A degree from the Pontifical Xavierian University in 1997. She was a member of the research group led by Pelayo Correa, first at Louisiana State University and then at Vanderbilt University, studying gastric cancer and its primary risk factor, Helicobacter pylori infection. In 2010, Camargo received a Ph.D. in public health with a concentration in epidemiology from the University of Illinois Chicago. Her dissertation was titled The role of EBV in gastric carcinogenesis epidemiologic modeling and molecular investigations. Garth Rauscher was her doctoral advisor. She conducted her dissertation work at the National Cancer Institute (NCI) infections and immunoepidemiology branch (IIB) on the role of Epstein–Barr virus infection in gastric carcinogenesis. She joined IIB as a postdoctoral fellow in 2010 and became an Earl Stadtman Tenure-Track Investigator in the metabolic epidemiology branch (MEB) in 2016.

References 

Living people
Place of birth missing (living people)
Year of birth missing (living people)
Pontifical Xavierian University alumni
University of Illinois Chicago alumni
National Institutes of Health people
21st-century Colombian women scientists
21st-century Colombian scientists
Colombian medical researchers
Colombian epidemiologists
Women epidemiologists
Cancer epidemiologists
Colombian emigrants to the United States
Expatriate academics in the United States